Joachim Werzlau (5 August 1913 – 23 October 2001) was a German pianist, radio consultant and composer. He belonged to the first generation of composers in the GDR, where he was also active in organisations and politics. As a pianist, he played for the theatre, for Mary Wigman's dance school, and a kabarett, among others. He composed popular songs, music for audio plays, film scores, incidental music, and three operas. With films such as Nackt unter Wölfen (Naked Among Wolves) and Jakob der Lügner (Jacob the Liar), he was the most popular film composer of the GDR of his time.

Early years 
Born in Leipzig the son of an orchestra musician, Werzlau tried first compositions at age twelve. His father taught him violin and piano. Since the family's economic situation prevented him from studying music, Werzlau began as an apprentice piano maker at the Blüthner company in his home town. He made money as a pianist as well as a composer at various cultural institutions in Leipzig. At age 22, he was offered the prospect of admission to study music at the University of Music and Theatre Leipzig, which he soon lost because of close contacts with left-wing artists. From 1941 to 1942 he performed military service, but then was forced to work in a factory until the end of the war.

After World War II 
After the end of the Nazi regime in Germany, Werzlau was active in the Antifa-Block and became a member of the Cultural Association of the GDR. He joined the SED party in 1946. In addition, Werzlau was repetiteur for the Mary Wigman School, and became director of the musical-literary kabarett Die Rampe in Leipzig.

Werzlau wrote his probably most popular song, Weil wir jung sind, ist die Welt so schön (Because we are young, the world is so beautiful) to lyrics by Gerhard Wolfram. Between 1949 and 1952, he was a music consultant (Musikreferent) at Berlin Radio, for which he also worked as a composer and program planner. During this time he also began composing songs for children, pioneers, youth and other mass groups, suitable to socialist holidays. This made him very popular in the GDR. He wrote film scores for DEFA from 1953, and became one of the influential film composers of the GDR. In the 1960 Fünf Patronenhülsen, he used recorder, guitar, trumpet and drums instead of an orchestra.

Werzlau was a founding member of the East German , an association of composers and musicologists, in 1951, and working freelance from then on. He served as chairman of the association's Berlin District from 1960 to 1964. In 1977, Werzlau became a member of the board of the Composers' Association. In both 1967 and 1981, he was honoured with the National Prize of the GDR.

Werzlau wrote his first opera Regine in 1963, which was premiered at the Hans Otto Theater in Potsdam with moderate success. In 1976, his second opera was premiered at the Berlin Staatsoper Unter den Linden with great success: Meister Röckle, to a libretto by Günther Deicke. The work was performed at several theatres in the GDR, including Weimar, Meiningen and Leipzig. In 1981, Meister Röckle was also performed in Moscow at the local music theatre for children by Natalia Saz. In the first half of the 1980s, Werzlau worked on his third opera, Zille Heinrich, about the popular Heinrich Zille.

Werzlau was married; the couple had a son, Friedemann. Werzlau died in Berlin at the age of 88.

Work 
Werzlau's compositions include: 
 Unser Leben im Lied, cantata for soloists, choir and orchestra, text by B. Seeger, 1959
 Episoden, five orchestral pieces, 1962
 Hans Marchwitza, a symphonic portrait for large orchestra, 1971
 Der strenge Chronos, 13 songs after Soviet poems, 1977
 Partita for violin solo, 1978
 Fahnenmarsch für großes Blasorchester, 1979
 Sanssouci for orchestra, 1979
 Szenen for orchestra, 1979
 Erinnerungen an Heinrich Zille, four sketches for piano, 1984
 Zille Heinrich, opera, libretto by H. Kahlau, first version 1980–84, second version 1986–88
 Kartoffelkantate, cantata for soloists, choir and instruments, text by Maria Dresdner, 1986
 Kontra Lamento for orchestra, new version 1986
 Aktion Berlin for large wind orchestra, 1986

Film scores 
Werzlau's film scores include:

 1950: Saure Wochen – frohe Feste
 1953: Die Störenfriede
 1953: Jacke wie Hose
 1954: Das geheimnisvolle Wrack
 1955: Der Teufel vom Mühlenberg
 1955: Robert Mayer – der Arzt aus Heilbronn
 1956: Genesung
 1956: Das tapfere Schneiderlein
 1957: Lissy
 1957: Tinko
 1957: Zwei Mütter
 1957: Polonia-Express
 1958: Sonnensucher
 1959: 
 1959: Eine alte Liebe
 1960: Fünf Patronenhülsen
 1960/2014: 
 1962: Königskinder
 1963: Karbid und Sauerampfer
 1963: Nackt unter Wölfen
 1974: Jakob der Lügner

Recording 

References

Further reading 
 
 J. Werzlau: "Contra Lamento". Reminiszenzen eines Musikers, Gesprächsprotokolle, Selbstzeugnisse sowie ein ausführliches Werkverzeichnis und eine umfangreiche Diskographie. (Against lamenting. Reminiscences of a musician, protocols of talks, self-documentation, a detailed list of works and discography) , Berlin 1988.

External links 
 
 

20th-century German composers
East German musicians
German opera composers
20th-century classical composers
Recipients of the Patriotic Order of Merit (honor clasp)
1913 births
2001 deaths
Musicians from Leipzig